The 2021 Louisville Cardinals women's soccer team represented University of Louisville during the 2021 NCAA Division I women's soccer season.  The Cardinals were led by head coach Karen Ferguson-Dayes, in her twenty-second season.  They played home games at Lynn Stadium.  This was the team's 37th season playing organized women's college soccer and their 8th playing in the Atlantic Coast Conference.

The Cardinals finished the season 7–7–2 overall and 3–6–1 in ACC play to finish in eleventh place.  The team did not qualify for the ACC Tournament and were not invited to the NCAA Tournament.

Previous season 

Due to the COVID-19 pandemic, the ACC played a reduced schedule in 2020 and the NCAA Tournament was postponed to 2021.  The ACC did not play a spring league schedule, but did allow teams to play non-conference games that would count toward their 2020 record in the lead up to the NCAA Tournament.

The Cardinals finished the fall season 4–5–0, 4–4–0 in ACC play to finish in a tie for sixth place.  They were awarded the sixth seed in the ACC Tournament based on tiebreakers.  In the tournament they lost to Virginia in the Quarterfinals.  The Cardinals finished the spring season 1–2–0 and were not invited to the NCAA Tournament.

Squad

Roster

Team management

Source:

Schedule

Source:

|-
!colspan=6 style=""| Exhibition

|-
!colspan=6 style=""| Non-Conference Regular Season

|-
!colspan=6 style=""| ACC Regular Season

Rankings

References

Louisville
Louisville
2021
Louisville women's soccer